Rory Maguire (born 1999) is an Irish Gaelic footballer who plays for club side Castlehaven and at inter-county level with the Cork senior football team. He usually lines out at centre-back.

Honours

Cork
All-Ireland Under-20 Football Championship: 2019
Munster Under-20 Football Championship: 2019

References

1999 births
Living people
MTU Cork Gaelic footballers
Castlehaven Gaelic footballers
Cork inter-county Gaelic footballers